Meini Cheung is a Hong Kong actress.

Filmography

Television series

References

External links

 

1980 births
Hong Kong people of Hakka descent
People from Zijin
Hong Kong film actresses
Living people
Hong Kong women artists